Klaus Keil (November 15, 1934–February 25, 2022) was a professor at the School of Ocean and Earth Science and Technology (SOEST) at the University of Hawaiʻi at Mānoa. He was the former Director of the Hawaiʻi Institute of Geophysics and Planetology. He was also the former director of the University of New Mexico Institute of Meteoritics. Klaus pioneered the use of the electron microprobe to study meteorite samples. He was one of the co-inventors of the Energy dispersive X-ray spectrometer.

In 1988, Klaus won the Leonard Medal, which is awarded by the Meteoritical Society. In 2006, he won the J. Lawrence Smith Medal, which is awarded by the National Academy of Sciences. These awards are for his pioneering quantitative studies of minerals in meteorites and important contributions to understanding the nature, origin, and evolution of their parent bodies.

Asteroid 5054 Keil and the mineral keilite are named after Klaus.

Klaus is the father of professional tennis players Mark Keil and Kathrin Keil.

See also
Glossary of meteoritics

References

1934 births
2022 deaths
German emigrants to the United States
University of Hawaiʻi faculty
Meteorite researchers
American scientists
Scientists from Hamburg